Diarmait Mac Murchada (Modern Irish: Diarmaid Mac Murchadha), anglicised as Dermot MacMurrough, Dermod MacMurrough, or Dermot MacMorrogh (c. 1110 – c. 1 May 1171), was a King of Leinster in Ireland. In 1167, he was deposed by the High King of Ireland, Ruaidrí Ua Conchobair (Rory O'Connor). The grounds for the deposition were that Mac Murchada had, in 1152, abducted Derbforgaill, the wife of the king of Breifne, Tiernan O'Rourke. To recover his kingdom, Mac Murchada solicited help from King Henry II of England. His issue unresolved, he gained the military support of the 2nd Earl of Pembroke (Richard de Clare, nicknamed "Strongbow"). At that time, Strongbow was in opposition to Henry II due to his support for Stephen, King of England against Henry's mother in the Anarchy. In exchange for his aid, Strongbow was promised in marriage to Mac Murchada's daughter Aoife with the right to succeed to the Kingship of Leinster. Henry II then mounted a larger second invasion in 1171 to ensure his control over Strongbow, resulting in the Norman Lordship of Ireland. Mac Murchada was later known as Diarmait na nGall (Irish for "Diarmait of the Foreigners"). He was seen in Irish history as the king that invited the first-ever wave of English settlers, who were planted by the Norman conquest. The invasion had a great deal of impact on Irish Christianity, increasing the de facto ability of the Holy See to regulate Christianity in Ireland.

Early life and family
Diarmait was born around 1110, a son of Donnchadh mac Murchada, King of Leinster and Dublin. His father's paternal grandmother, Derbforgaill, was a daughter of Donnchad, King of Munster and thus a granddaughter of Brian Boru. In 1115 his father attacked Domnall Gerrlámhach, King of Dublin, but died in the ensuing battle. The citizens of Dublin buried him with the carcass of a dog, considered to be a huge insult.

He had two wives (as allowed under the Brehon laws), the first of whom, Sadhbh Ní Faeláin, was mother of a daughter named Órlaith who married Domnall Mór, King of Munster. His second wife, Mór ingen Muirchertaig, was mother of Aoife / Eva of Leinster and his youngest son Conchobar Mac Murchada. He also had two other sons, Domhnall Caomhánach mac Murchada and Énna Cennselach mac Murchada (blinded 1169). Diarmait is buried in the Cathedral graveyard of Ferns village.

King of Leinster
After the death of his older brother, Énna Mac Murchada, Diarmait unexpectedly became King of Leinster. This was opposed by the then High King of Ireland, Toirdelbach Ua Conchobair (Turlough O'Conor) who feared (rightly) that Mac Murchada would become a rival. Toirdelbach sent one of his allied kings, Tigernán Ua Ruairc (Tiernan O'Rourke) to conquer Leinster and oust the young Mac Murchada. Ua Ruairc went on a brutal campaign slaughtering the livestock of Leinster and thereby trying to starve the province's residents. Mac Murchada was ousted from his throne, but was able to regain it with the help of the Leinster clans in 1132. Afterwards followed two decades of uneasy peace between Ua Conchobair and Diarmait. In 1152 he even assisted the High King to raid the land of Ua Ruairc who had by then become a renegade.

Mac Murchada also is said to have abducted Ua Ruairc's wife Derbforgaill (English: Dervorgilla) along with all her furniture and goods, with the aid of Derbforgaill's brother, a future pretender to the kingship of Meath. Other sources say that Derbforgaill was not an unwilling prisoner and that she remained in Ferns with Mac Murchada in comfort for a number of years. Her advanced age indicates that she may have been a refugee or a hostage; in any case, she was under his protection. Whatever the reality, the "abduction" was given as a further reason or excuse for enmity between the two kings.

Church builder
As king of Leinster, in the years 1140–70 Diarmait commissioned the Irish Romanesque buildings of:
 Baltinglass Abbey
 St Saviour's Priory
 Ferns Abbey
 Killeshin Church

He sponsored convents (nunneries) at Dublin (St Mary's, 1146), and around 1151 two more at Aghade, County Carlow and at Kilculliheen near Waterford city. The abbey of St. Mary Del Hogge in Dublin was named after the Hoggen Green or Haugr meaning gravesite in old Norse. This site later became 'College Green' after the Reformation and the establishment of Trinity College. It's said that in the late 1600s that Viking graves were still to be seen at Hoggen Green.

He also sponsored the successful career of churchman St Lawrence O'Toole (Lorcán Ua Tuathail). He married O'Toole's half-sister Mor in 1153 and presided at the synod of Clane in 1161 when O'Toole was installed as archbishop of Dublin.

Exile and return

In 1166, Ireland's High King and Mac Murchada's main ally Muirchertach Ua Lochlainn had fallen, and a large coalition led by Tigernán Ua Ruairc (Mac Murchada's arch enemy) marched on Leinster. The new High King Ruaidrí Ua Conchobair deposed Mac Murchada from the throne of Leinster. Mac Murchada fled to Wales and from there to England and France seeking the support of Henry II of England in the recruitment of soldiers to reclaim his kingship. Henry authorised Diarmait to seek help from the soldiers and mercenaries in his kingdom. Those who agreed to help included Richard de Clare and half-brothers Robert FitzStephen and Maurice FitzGerald. Robert was accompanied by his half-nephew Robert de Barry. Strongbow was offered Diarmait's daughter Aoife in marriage and promised the kingship of Leinster on Diarmait's death. Robert and Maurice were promised lands in Wexford and elsewhere for their services.

On returning to Wales, Robert FitzStephen helped him organise a mercenary army of English and Welsh soldiers. Landing at Bannow Bay, they laid siege to Wexford which fell in May 1169. After a period of inactivity, they went on to raid the Kingdom of Ossory. They then launched raids in the territories of the Uí Tuathail, the Uí Broin, and Uí Conchobhair Failghe. Mac Murchada gambled that King Ruaidrí would not hurt the Leinster hostages which he had, which included Mac Murchada's son, Conchobar Mac Murchada. However, Ua Ruairc forced his hand and they were all killed. Although he had been distracted by disturbances elsewhere in the kingdom, King Ruaidrí could no longer ignore this powerful force.

He marched his forces into Leinster and, with the mediation of the Church, the commanders of the two armies began negotiations at Ferns, Diarmait's political base. An agreement was reached, whereby Diarmait was allowed to remain King of Leinster with Diarmait for his part recognising Ua Conchobair as High King. Some historians maintain that the treaty with Ua Conchobair included a secret agreement whereby Diarmait undertook to bring in no more foreign mercenaries and to send away Robert FitzStephen and his men as soon as Leinster was subdued. It's possible that Mac Murchada's hand may have been forced by the arrival at Wexford in May 1170 of Maurice FitzGerald, Lord of Llanstephan and his force of 10 knights, thirty men-at-arms and a hundred archers and foot soldiers. Mac Murchada and FitzGerald marched on the Ostman Norse–Gaelic city of Dublin which surrendered. Within a short time, all Leinster was again in Mac Murchada's control. Emboldened by these victories, he sent Robert FitzStephen to the assistance of his son-in-law, Domnall Mór Ua Briain, the King of Thomond.

In the opinion of some historians, Mac Murchada's plans may have been limited to the recovery of his throne; only later when the superiority of the mercenary arms had overawed the Gaelic nobility of Ireland did he consider tilting at the high kingship itself. According to the contemporary, Gerald of Wales, he was advised by Robert FitzStephen and Maurice FitzGerald to write to Strongbow requesting assistance. Strongbow sent an advance party under Raymond le Gros, arriving himself in 1170 at the Ostman Norse–Gaelic settlement of Waterford. Following the fall of Waterford, the promised marriage of Aoife and Strongbow took place. As a result, Richard FitzGilbert, count of Strigoil, became lord of Leinster. The marriage was imagined and painted in the Romantic style in 1854 by Daniel Maclise.

Mac Murchada was devastated after the death of his youngest son, Conchobar, retreated to Ferns and died a few months later.

Later reputation
The scholar Áed Ua Crimthainn was probably Diarmait's court historian. In his Book of Leinster, Áed seems to be the first to set out the concept of the rí Érenn co fressabra, the "king of Ireland with opposition", later more widely adopted. This described Diarmait's ambitions and the achievements of his great-grandfather Diarmait mac Maíl na mBó.

In Irish history books written after 1800, Diarmait Mac Murchada was often seen as a traitor, but his intention was not to aid an English invasion of Ireland, but rather to use Henry's assistance to become the High King of Ireland himself. The imperialism of the English, and later British, empire must not be placed anachronistically on the events of 1166. The adventurers who answered Diarmait's call for help were reacting to the opportunity for land and wealth. Henry II did not wish to invade Ireland, he was forced to react to earl Richard's aggrandisement. The counts of Strigoil had been supporters of King Stephen, and Henry II did not forget easily.

Gerald of Wales, a Cambro-English cleric who visited Ireland in 1185 and whose uncles and cousins were prominent soldiers in the army of Strongbow, repeated their opinions of Mac Murchada:

Death and descendants

After Strongbow's successful invasion, Henry II mounted a second and larger invasion in 1171 to ensure his control over his subjects, which succeeded. He then accepted the submission of the Irish kings in Dublin in November 1171. He also ensured that his moral claim to Ireland, granted by the supposed 1155 papal bull Laudabiliter, was reconfirmed in 1172 by Pope Alexander III, and also by a synod of all the Irish bishops at the Synod of Cashel. He added "Lord of Ireland" to his many other titles. Before he could consolidate his new Lordship he had to go to France to deal with his sons' rebellion in 1173.

Ruaidrí Ua Conchobair was soon ousted, first as King of Ireland and eventually as King of Connacht. The Lordship directly controlled a small territory in Ireland surrounding the cities of Dublin and Waterford, while the rest of Ireland was divided between English lords and court curiales. The 1175 Treaty of Windsor, brokered by St Lawrence O'Toole with Henry II, formalised the submission of the Gaelic clans that remained in local control, like the Uí Conchobair who retained Connacht and the Uí Néill who retained most of Ulster.

Diarmait's male-line descendants included Art Óg mac Murchadha Caomhánach (d. 1417), who revived the kingship of Leinster, and Cahir mac Art Kavanagh (died 1554) who continued to rule parts of Leinster independently of the English until the Tudor conquest of Ireland in the 16th century. The last proclaimed King of Leinster, Domhnall Spáinneach Mac Murchadha Caomhánach, died in 1632. Later senior descendants who retained the position among the Irish upper-classes included Arthur MacMorrough Kavanagh (1831–1889) and his son, Walter MacMurrough Kavanagh 1856–1922). Dermot McMorrough Kavanagh (d. 1958) was recognised as Chief of the Name of Clann Caomhánach (Kavanagh) in his lifetime.

Diarmait died about 1 May 1171 and was buried in Ferns Cathedral, where his grave can be seen in the outside graveyard.

Ancestry

Theatrical representations
In the play The Dreaming of the Bones by W. B. Yeats, the ghosts of Dermot and Derbforgaill rescue an Irish rebel during the Easter Week rebellion, and reveal that they are bound until an Irishman can forgive them for bringing the Normans to Ireland.

See also
Irish nobility
Irish royal families
Kings of Leinster
McMorrow

References

Sources
Annals of the Four Masters, ed. J. O'Donovan; 1990 edition.
Expugnatio Hibernica, by Giraldus Cambrensis; ed., with transln and historical notes, by A. B. Scott and F. X. Martin. Dublin: Royal Irish Academy, 1978 
Byrne, Francis J. (1973) Irish Kings and High Kings. London: Batsford (Rev. ed. Dublin: Four Courts, 1999)
Roche, Richard (1995) The Norman Invasion of Ireland. Dublin: Anvil Books (1st ed. [Tralee]: Anvil Books, c1970)
O'Byrne, Emmett (2003) War, Politics and the Irish of Leinster 1156-160. Dublin: Four Courts
Furlong, Nicholas (1973) Dermot, King of Leinster, and the foreigners. Tralee: Anvil Books  
--do.-- Dermait, King of Leinster. Cork: Mercier Press, 2006  
Ancestral Roots of Certain American Colonists Who Came to America Before 1700; by Frederick Lewis Weis, Lines: 66–26, 175–6

Sources for genealogy
Byrne, Francis J. (1973) Irish Kings and High-Kings. London: Batsford (Rev. ed. Dublin: Four Courts, 1999) "Uí Cheinnselaig Kings of Laigin", p. 290 
O'Byrne, Emmett (2003) War, Politics and the Irish of Leinster Dublin: Four Courts; "The MacMurrough-Kavanagh kings of Leinster; Outline Genealogies I, Ia, Ib", pages 247–249. 
O'Hart, John (1892) Irish Pedigrees; 5th ed. 2 vols. Dublin: James Duffy, pp. 157, 555. (1st ed.: 1878; several later eds.)

 

1110s births
1171 deaths
Kings of Leinster
Monarchs who abdicated
12th-century Irish monarchs
People from Ferns
MacMorrough Kavanagh dynasty